Jørgen Tofte Nielsen (born 6 May 1971) is a Danish former professional footballer who played as a goalkeeper.

Playing career
Nielsen was born in Nykøbing Falster, Denmark. He signed for Liverpool in 1997 and was at Anfield for five years, but he left in 2002 having never playing a competitive game for the club. However, his shirt did taste Premier League action, against Everton on 27 September 1999. In the 77th minute of the game, goalkeeper Sander Westerveld and Everton striker Francis Jeffers got into a fight and both were sent off, but due to Liverpool having used all of their substitutions, left back Steve Staunton borrowed Nielsen's shirt and filled in as goalkeeper for the remainder of the match.

Nielsen retired from playing in September 2007 in order to concentrate on his political science university degree. In March 2008 he made his comeback.

Honours
Individual
Det Gyldne Bur (Goalkeeper of the Year in the Danish Leagues): 1996

References

External links

 Boldklubben Frem profile
Liverpool FC profile
Profile at LFCHistory.net

1971 births
Living people
People from Guldborgsund Municipality
Danish men's footballers
Association football goalkeepers
Hvidovre IF players
Liverpool F.C. players
Wolverhampton Wanderers F.C. players
Farum BK players
Boldklubben Frem players
Næstved Boldklub players
Ikast FS players
Sportspeople from Region Zealand